Aeropuertos Argentina 2000 S.A., sometimes abbreviated as AA2000, is a company based in the city of Buenos Aires that operates 35 airports in Argentina.

It was founded in 1998 to manage and operate airports within the Argentine territory, and presently has more than 2,300 employees.

Airports

See also

Transport in Argentina
List of airports in Argentina

Transport companies of Argentina